Silver Sands is an inner northern coastal suburb of Mandurah, Western Australia.

The suburb, along with neighbouring San Remo, were gazetted in 1989. Both suburbs were named after developer estates, which entered into popular local usage.

References

Suburbs of Mandurah